Lake Lagernoye is a small lake situated just south of the camp at Molodyozhnaya Station and close west of Lake Glubokoye, in the Thala Hills, Enderby Land.  Mapped and named "Ozero Lagernoye" (camp lake) by the Soviet Antarctic Expedition, 1961–62.

References

Lakes of Antarctica
Bodies of water of Enderby Land